Frances Jean Eivers is a New Zealand District Court judge; she is Māori and is a member of the Ngāti Maniapoto iwi. In October 2021 she was appointed Children's Commissioner for New Zealand.

Biography 
Eivers was born and brought up in Te Teko in the eastern Bay of Plenty. She began her legal career in 1985, when she was admitted to the bar in the Auckland High Court. She has worked as a solicitor both in England and New Zealand, specialising in family law. In November 2000 she was appointed Counsel for the Child and in 2004 was appointed a Youth Advocate. Eivers was appointed a District Court judge with a Family Court warrant in 2009. She was sworn in as a judge at a ceremony held at her home marae, Te Teko's Kokohinau Marae. In addition, she has presided over Rangatahi Courts, which hear cases involving young Māori people. 

Eivers was a founding member of Te Huinga Roia (Māori Law Society) and serves as a mentor to law students at the University of Auckland Law School.

References 

Ngāti Maniapoto people
Children's Ombudspersons in New Zealand
20th-century New Zealand lawyers
21st-century New Zealand lawyers
21st-century New Zealand judges
People from the Bay of Plenty Region
Year of birth missing (living people)
Living people
District Court of New Zealand judges
Family Court of New Zealand judges